Barbara Stevens may refer to:

People
Barbara Stevens (basketball)
Barbara Stevens in 2004 North Tyneside Metropolitan Borough Council election#Cullercoats
Barbara Stevens, contestant in Miss Universe 1980

Fictional characters
Barbara Stevens, fictional ex-wife of Donald Fisher (Home and Away)
Barbara Stevens, character in Loft (2008 film) and The Loft (2014 film)

See also
Barbara Stephens (disambiguation)